The Annapolis Convention was an Assembly of the Counties of Maryland that functioned as the colony's provincial government from 1774 to 1776 during the early days leading up to the American Revolution.  After 1775, it was officially named the Assembly of Freemen.

Background

In 1774, the committees of correspondence that had sprung up throughout the colonies were being drawn to the support of Boston, as they reacted to the closing of the port and increase of  the  occupying military force.  Massachusetts had asked for a general meeting or Continental Congress to consider joint action.  To forestall any such action, the royal governor of Maryland, Robert Eden prorogued the Assembly on April 19, 1774. 
This was the last session of the colonial assembly ever held in Maryland. But, the assembly members agreed to meet in June at Annapolis after they went home to determine the wishes of the citizens in the counties they represented.

Over the next two and a half years, the Convention met nine times and operated as the state or colony level of government for Maryland. Throughout the period, they maintained some standing committees that continued their function between sessions.

Sessions of the Convention

1774 sessions
The first convention lasted four days, from June 22 to June 25, 1774. All sixteen counties were represented by a total of 92 members. They elected Matthew Tilghman as their chair. Within that short time, they agreed:
That each county should have one vote.
Passed resolutions supporting Boston, and ordered supplies sent to them.
The Convention would continue from time to time as needed.
A Committee of Correspondence would continue between sessions, and members were named.
They would support non-importation agreements if the Continental Congress called for them.
Elected delegates to the first Continental Congress.
Other sessions were held on November 21 – November 25, and December 8 – December 12.

1775 sessions
July 26 – August 14 and December 7, 1775 – January 28, 1776

Declaration of the Association of the Freemen of Maryland

Note by Maryland Historical Society
The original engagement of the Associators, preserved under glass at Annapolis, consists of two pieces, apparently torn apart, and pasted down on card-board.  On our p. 67 the order of names and arrangement of columns have been preserved, though not the spacing; and the division of the pieces falls just below the names of Joseph Sim, Thomas Dorsey, and Charles Ridgely.

On comparing these signatures with the Journal, 29 names will be found to be missing, viz: Philip Richard Fendall I (1734–1805) of Charles Co.; Alexander Somerville of Calvert; George Lee and Dr Richard Brooke of Prince George's; Thomas Tillard and John Dorsey of Anne Arundel; Walter Tolly, James Gittings, and Charles Ridgely of John, of Baltimore; Charles Beatty, Baker Johnson, Jacob Funk, Samuel Beall, and Wm. Deakins Jr., of Frederick; Samuel Durham, Saml. Ashmead, John Beall Howard, Francis Holland, Benjamin Rumsey, and James McComas, of Harford; Joseph Gilpin and William Rumsey, of Cecil; Richard Lloyd of Kent; John Wallace and John Brown, of Queen Anne's; Robert Harrison of Dorchester; Benson Stainton of Caroline; Josiah Polk of Somerset; Peter Chaille of Worcester.

Now when we note that amongst these 29 were some of the most active and assiduous members of the Convention, and that 21 of them had, as the Journal shows, no leave of absence, it is impossible to resist the conclusion that a portion of the document has been lost.  It will be observed that the arrangement is generally by counties, and the break in the paper comes between Prince George's and Queen Anne's, between Ann Arundel and Dorchester, and between Baltimore and Worcester; a fact which confirms the editor's belief that a piece has fallen out between the upper and lower portions as now joined.

1776 sessions
May 8 – May 25, June 21 – July 6, and August 14 – November 11

The eighth session decided that the continuation of an ad hoc government by the convention was not a good mechanism for all the concerns of the province. A more permanent and structured government was needed. So, on July 3, 1776, they resolved that a new convention be elected that would be responsible for drawing up their first state constitution, one that did not refer to parliament or the king, but would be a government "...of the people only." After they set dates and prepared notices to the counties they adjourned. On August 1 all freemen with property elected delegates for the last convention.

The ninth and last convention was also known as the Constitutional Convention of 1776. They drafted a constitution, and when they adjourned on November 11, they would not meet again. The Conventions were replaced by the new state government.

See also
History of Maryland
History of Maryland in the American Revolution
List of delegates to the Maryland Constitutional Convention (1776)

References

External links
Image and Text of Proceedings in Maryland Archives

Maryland in the American Revolution
History of the Thirteen Colonies
1774 in Maryland
1775 in Maryland
1776 in Maryland